The Hefer Valley Regional Council (Mo'atza Azorit Emek Hefer) is a regional council in the Hefer Valley region of the Sharon plain in central Israel. It is named after an administrative district in this area in the time of King Solomon.

The council covers an area adjacent to Hadera in the north, to Netanya in the south, to the Mediterranean in the west and to Tulkarm and the Green Line in the east. As of December 2020, the jurisdiction area of the council has a population of about 42,600 people.

The Regional Council offices are located near Kfar Monash, at the Ruppin junction, next to the Ruppin Academic Center.

History

The region of Emek Hefer covers an area known to its former  Palestinian inhabitants as  Wadi al-Hawarith

In the early 1900s, a local midwife, Olga Hankin, reported information about the economic state of the families in the region to her husband, Yehoshua Hankin, who was in charge of land purchase for the Jewish National Fund. In 1927 Yehoshua Hankin resolved the complex legal issues involved in purchasing the land, and signed an agreement for the purchase of the Hefer Valley. The only difficulty was that the Jewish National Fund did not have sufficient funds to pay the sum needed for buying the land.

The chairman of the JNF, Menachem Ussishkin, set out on a fundraising trip to Canada, returning with $300,000 and undertakings to bring it up to a million, the sum required to purchase the Hefer Valley over a period of seven years. At the Zionist Congress held in Zurich in 1929, Ussishkin announced that Emek Hefer was now in Jewish hands.

A group of 20 young members of the "Vitkin" and "Haemek" ('the valley') movements settled in the newly purchased valley. They moved into an abandoned building and began draining the swamps and preparing the land for agriculture.

In April 1933, they built their first houses at Kfar Vitkin, in the heart of the valley. In 1931, a group from the Hashomer Hatzair movement in Hadera established the settlement of Ein HaHoresh, planting the first citrus grove.

A company called "Yachin" prepared plantations for settlers from abroad. Another group from the Kibbutz HaMeuhad movement, founded Givat Haim in 1932, while the organization of demobilized soldiers from the Jewish Brigade set up the settlement of Avihayil.

Ruppin Academic Center was established in the region in 1949.

List of settlements

Kibbutzim

Bahan
Ein HaHoresh
Givat Haim (Ihud)
Givat Haim (Meuhad)
HaMa'apil
HaOgen
Ma'abarot
Mishmar HaSharon
Yad Hana

Moshavim

Ahituv
Avihayil
Be'erotayim
Beit HaLevi
Beit Herut
Beit Yanai
Beit Yitzhak-Sha'ar Hefer

Beitan Aharon
Burgata
Eliashiv
Elyakhin
Gan Yoshiya
Geulei Teiman
Givat Shapira
Hadar Am

Haniel
Havatzelet HaSharon
Herev Le'et
Hibat Tzion
Hogla
Kfar Haim
Kfar Haroeh

Kfar Monash
Kfar Vitkin
Kfar Yedidia
Mikhmoret
Olesh
Ometz

Community settlements

Bat Hen
Bat Hefer

Beit Hazon
Hofit

Shoshanat HaAmakim
Tzukei Yam

Youth villages
Hadassah Neurim
Mevo'ot Yam

References

External links
 

 
Regional councils in Israel
Central District (Israel)
Sharon plain